A Trade Repository or Swap Data Repository is an entity that centrally collects and maintains the records of over-the-counter (OTC) derivatives. These electronic platforms, acting as authoritative registries of key information regarding open OTC derivatives trades, provide an effective tool for mitigating the inherent opacity of OTC derivatives markets.

This market infrastructure is defined and supervised in Europe by the European Securities and Markets Authority (ESMA) under the European Market Infrastructure Regulation (EMIR). Similar regulatory initiatives are conducted in the United States where the Commodity Futures Trading Commission (CFTC) has developed the Dodd-Frank Act regulation, under which Swap Data Repositories are regulated.

The strengthening of the derivatives markets regulatory framework finds its origin in the 26 September 2009 summit in Pittsburgh, where G20 Leaders agreed that all standardised OTC derivative contracts should be cleared through central counterparties (CCP) by end-2012 at the latest and that OTC derivative contracts should be reported to trade repositories.

References 

EU Legislative Proposals
Adoption of the regulatory and implementing technical standards for the Regulation on OTC derivatives, central counterparties and trade repositories

On 19 December 2012, the European Commission has adopted nine regulatory and implementing technical standards to complement the obligations defined under the Regulation on OTC derivatives, central counterparties (CCPs) and trade. They were developed by the European Supervisory Authorities and have been endorsed by the European Commission without modification.

The adoption of these technical standards finalises requirements for the mandatory clearing and reporting of transactions, in line with the EU's G20 commitment made in Pittsburgh in September 2009.

  
 Regulatory technical standards on the minimum details of the data to be reported to trade repositories
 Regulatory technical standards specifying the details of the application for registration as a trade repository
 Regulatory technical standards specifying the data to be published and made available by trade repositories and operational standards for aggregating, comparing and accessing the data
 Implementing technical standards on the minimum details of the data to be reported to trade repositories
https://web.archive.org/web/20140813183506/http://ec.europa.eu/internal_market/financial-markets/docs/derivatives/121219_its_minimum-details-trade-repositories_en.pdf

 Implementing technical standards specifying the details of the application for registration as a trade repository PDF
https://web.archive.org/web/20140813183504/http://ec.europa.eu/internal_market/financial-markets/docs/derivatives/121219_its_details-application-trade-repositories_en.pdf

External links 
 The Independent Trade Repository 
 FX-MM Magazine 
 DTCC Global Trade Repository for OTC Derivatives
 Trade Information Warehouse Reports
 European Trade Repository
 Derivatives / EMIR webpage at European Commission
 EMIR webpage at ESMA
 Role of Swap Execution Facilities (SEFs) in Derivatives Trade Execution, Clearing and Reporting
 KDPW_TR Trade Repository

Financial regulatory authorities
Derivatives (finance)